is an underground railway station on the Sendai Subway Nanboku Line in Wakabayashi-ku, Sendai, Miyagi Prefecture, Japan.

Lines

Station layout

Kawaramachi Station is an underground station with a single island platform serving two tracks.

Platforms

History
Kawaramachi Station opened on 15 July 1987.

Passenger statistics
In fiscal 2015, the station was used by an average of 5,050 passengers daily.

Surrounding area
 National Route 4
Miyazawa Bridge
Kawaramachi Shopping District

See also
 List of railway stations in Japan

References

External links

 

Railway stations in Sendai
Sendai Subway Namboku Line
Railway stations in Japan opened in 1987